Vilkaviškis Manor is a former residential manor in Vilkaviškis, Vilkaviškis District Municipality, Lithuania. Currently it is partially reconstructed.

References

Manor houses in Lithuania
Classicism architecture in Lithuania
Buildings and structures in Vilkaviškis